Foliation may refer to:

 Foliation, a geometric device used to study manifolds
 Foliation (geology), a property of certain rocks
 A pagination system in book production
 Vernation, the growth and arrangement of leaves
 In architecture, an ornamentation consisting of a carved leaf shape, as in trefoils
 In dragonfly morphology, leaf-like extensions on segment 8 or segment 9 of the abdomen